4,4′-Dichlorodiphenyl sulfone (DCDPS) is an organic compound with the formula (ClC6H4)2SO2.  Classified as a sulfone, this white solid is most commonly used as a precursor to polymers that are rigid and temperature-resistant such as PES or Udel.

Synthesis and reactions
DCDPS is synthesized via sulfonation of chlorobenzene with sulfuric acid, often in the presence of various additives to optimize the formation of the 4,4′-isomer:
ClC6H5  +  SO3   →   (ClC6H4)2SO2  +  H2O
It can also be produced by chlorination of diphenylsulfone.

With chloride substituents activated toward substitution, DCDPS is useful in the production of polysulfones:
n (ClC6H4)2SO2  +  n NaO−X−ONa   →   [(O−X−OC6H4)2SO2]n  +  2n NaCl

Further reading

 Radel PPSU, Veradel PESU and Acudel modified PPSU Design Guide by Solvay

References

Benzosulfones